Henri Chomette (1896–1941) was a French actor, screenwriter and film director. He was the brother of the film director René Clair.

Selected filmography
 Roger la Honte (1922)
 De quoi revient les junes film
 Durand Versus Durand (1931)

References

Bibliography
 Jan-Christopher Horak. Lovers of Cinema: The First American Film Avant-garde, 1919–1945. Univ of Wisconsin Press, 1995.

External links

1896 births
1941 deaths
French male film actors
20th-century French screenwriters
Film directors from Paris